Jean-Martin Mouloungui (born 30 November 1969) is a Gabonese footballer who played as a defender for Mbilinga FC and Greek club Panelefsiniakos. He made 46 appearances for the Gabon national team from 1993 to 2000. He was also named in Gabon's squad for the 1996 African Cup of Nations tournament.

References

External links
 

1969 births
Living people
Gabonese footballers
Association football defenders
Gabon international footballers
1996 African Cup of Nations players
2000 African Cup of Nations players
Super League Greece players
Mbilinga FC players
Panelefsiniakos F.C. players
Gabonese expatriate footballers
Gabonese expatriate sportspeople in Greece
Expatriate footballers in Greece
Place of birth missing (living people)
21st-century Gabonese people